Gerlof van Vloten (1866–1903), was a Dutch orientalist, writer and translator. He was the editor of the 1895 edition of the Arabic encyclopedia Mafātīḥ al-ʿulūm.

See also
Van Vloten (family)

References

Dutch orientalists
Dutch scholars of Islam
1866 births
1903 deaths